The Bothongo WonderCave in Kromdraai, Gauteng, South Africa is situated within the Bothongo Rhino & Lion Nature Reserve in the Cradle of Humankind, a UNESCO World Heritage Site. The cave is the third-largest cave chamber in the country (behind the second largest, Sudwala Caves, and the largest, Cango Caves). It is 5-10 million years old.

It was discovered in the late nineteenth century by miners who dynamited and excavated limestone for the making of cement. Mining stopped during the Second Boer War and never resumed.

The cave has about 14 stalactite and stalagmite formations up to 15 metres high, 85% of which are still growing. The 60-metre-deep cave is accessible to visitors by elevator. The cave can be visited as an attraction on its own.

See also
Cradle of Humankind
List of caves in South Africa
Muldersdrift

References

External links

Southern Africa Places
Bothongo Rhino & Lion Nature Reserve - WonderCave

Caves of South Africa
Limestone caves
World Heritage Sites in South Africa
Landforms of Gauteng
Tourist attractions in Gauteng
Show caves
Mogale City Local Municipality
Archaeological sites of Southern Africa